Saint-André-de-Corcy is a commune in the Ain département in eastern France.

Population

Sites and monuments
The commune has several châteaux and poypes (fortified mounds, or mottes). The motte castrale Poype de la Roussière has been listed as monument historique by the French Ministry of Culture since 1989. The Château de Montribloud a castle converted to a residence, dates from the 14th century.

See also
Communes of the Ain department

References

Communes of Ain
Ain communes articles needing translation from French Wikipedia